The 11th General Assembly of Nova Scotia represented Nova Scotia between 1818 and 1820.

The assembly sat at the pleasure of the Governor of Nova Scotia, George Ramsay.

Simon Bradstreet Robie was chosen as speaker for the house.

List of members

Notes:

References
Journal and proceedings of the House of Assembly, 1819 (1819)

Terms of the General Assembly of Nova Scotia
1818 in Canada
1819 in Canada
1820 in Canada
1818 establishments in Nova Scotia
1820 disestablishments in Nova Scotia